Jason Gooding (born March 2, 1979) is a Triathlete from Trinidad and Tobago.  He is a nine-time national champion.

Competition highlights
Elite Male Winner of the Maple Lodge Farms Triathlon Series 2003
Represented Trinidad and Tobago at 6 World Triathlon Championships
Competed at 6 International Triathlon Union ITU World Cup races
Competed at the 2002 Commonwealth Games in Manchester, England
9 X Trinidad and Tobago National Triathlon Champion
Competition wins in Grenada, Barbados, Nevis, Puerto Rico, Canada, United States

References

External links
 Jason GOODING
 Odessey Timing Company
 Rainbow Warriors Triathlon Club
 Trinidad and Tobago Triathlon Association

1979 births
Living people
Trinidad and Tobago male  triathletes
Triathletes at the 2002 Commonwealth Games
Commonwealth Games competitors for Trinidad and Tobago